Julian B. Garrett (born November 7, 1940) is an American lawyer and politician and is currently the Senator from the 11th district in the Iowa Senate.

Background 
Garrett served as a Republican in the Iowa House of Representatives as the Representative from the 73rd District from 2011 until 2013. In November 2013, Garrett was elected to the Iowa State Senate in a special election following the resignation of Kent Sorenson who plead guilty to obstruction of justice and other felonies related to campaign finances. 
Garrett was subsequently re-elected in 2014, 2018, and 2022. Garrett was born in Des Moines, Iowa and resides in Indianola. He has a B.A. from Central College and a J.D. from the University of Iowa College of Law.

Electoral history 
*incumbent

References

External links 

Representative Julian Garrett official Iowa General Assembly site
 

1940 births
Central College (Iowa) alumni
University of Iowa College of Law alumni
Republican Party Iowa state senators
Republican Party members of the Iowa House of Representatives
Living people
People from Indianola, Iowa
Politicians from Des Moines, Iowa
21st-century American politicians